The ashy-headed green pigeon (Treron phayrei) is a pigeon in the genus Treron. It is found from Nepal, northeast India, and Bangladesh to southwest China, Myanmar, Thailand, Laos, and Vietnam. Many authorities split the species from the pompadour green pigeon complex. It has been added to the Red List of IUCN in 2014.

Behaviour

The ashy-headed green pigeon usually occurs singly or in small groups. Its flight is fast and direct, with the regular beats and an occasional sharp flick of the wings that are characteristic of pigeons in general. It eats the seeds and fruits of a wide variety of plants. It builds a stick nest in a tree and lays two white eggs.

References

Collar, N.J. 2011. Species limits in some Philippine birds including the Greater Flameback Chrysocolaptes lucidus. Forktail number 27: 29–38.
Rasmussen, P.C., and J.C. Anderton. 2005. Birds of South Asia: the Ripley guide. Lynx Edicions and Smithsonian Institution.

ashy-headed green pigeon
Birds of the Himalayas
Birds of Northeast India
Birds of Southeast Asia
ashy-headed green pigeon
ashy-headed green pigeon